The Lingua Mortis Trilogy (The Classic Collection) is a box set by the German heavy metal band Rage. It was released in October 2002, by GUN Records. It contains digipack versions of three "classical" albums by Rage with the Lingua Mortis Orchestra: Lingua Mortis, XIII and Ghosts.

Box set items
The following items are included in the set:
XIII (1998) - 1:02:45
Ghosts (1999) - 55:28
Lingua Mortis (1996) - 43:05

Personnel

Band members
Peter "Peavy" Wagner - vocals, bass
Spiros Efthimiadis - guitars
Sven Fischer - guitars
Chris Efthimiadis - drums

Additional musicians
 Christian Wolff - piano 
 Lingua Mortis Orchestra

Production
 Ulli Pössell - producer, engineer, mixing
 Christian Wolf - producer
 Charly Czajkowski - producer

Rage (German band) albums
2002 compilation albums